Barbara Martha Bartlett is a South African politician. A member of the African National Congress, she has been serving as a permanent delegate to the National Council of Provinces since June 2020.  From May 2014 to June 2020, Bartlett was a Member of the Northern Cape Provincial Legislature and a Member of the Executive Council in the provincial government.

Provincial government
Bartlett was elected to the Northern Cape Provincial Legislature in 2014. She was sworn in as a member of the provincial legislature on 21 May 2014. On 30 May 2014, premier Sylvia Lucas appointed Bartlett as the Member of the Executive Council (MEC) for Transport, Safety and Liaison. She took office on the same day and succeeded Mac Jack.

On 1 March 2016, Lucas appointed Bartlett as the MEC for Education. She succeeded Grizelda Cjiekella, who died in October 2015. Pauline Williams took over as MEC for Transport, Safety and Liaison. Bartlett remained in the position until after the 2019 general election, when newly elected provincial premier Zamani Saul moved her to the Social Development portfolio. She succeeded Gift van Staden, while Mac Jack took over as Education MEC.

Bartlett resigned from the provincial government on 11 June 2020. Saul designated Nontobeko Vilakazi to take over as MEC for Social Development on 26 June.

Parliamentary career
On 26 June 2020, Bartlett was sworn in as a permanent delegate to the National Council of Provinces. She received her committee assignments on the same day.

Committee assignments
Joint Standing Committee on Defence
Select Committee on Petitions and Executive Undertakings
Select Committee on Security and Justice
Select Committee on Cooperative Governance and Traditional Affairs

References

External links

Members of the Northern Cape Provincial Legislature
African National Congress politicians
Living people
People from the Northern Cape
Year of birth missing (living people)
Members of the National Council of Provinces
Women members of the National Council of Provinces